St Mary's Churchyard may refer to:

 St. Mary's Episcopal Church, Burlington, New Jersey
 St Mary's Churchyard, Hendon, London